Nuestra Belleza Baja California 2009, is a beauty pageant held in the Jardines de Canal 12 in Tijuana, Baja California on July 29, 2009. At the conclusion of the final night of competition Ana Sofía García of Mexicali was crowned the winner. García was crowned by outgoing Nuestra Belleza Baja California titleholder Paulina Hernández. Four contestants competed for the title.

Results

Placements

Special awards

Contestants

References

External links
Official Website

Nuestra Belleza México
Beauty pageants in Tijuana